The modifier letter double apostrophe (ˮ) is a spacing glyph. It is used in the orthography of Tundra Nenets to denote a glottal stop, in the Enets alphabet and in the orthography of Dan to indicate that a syllable has a top tone.

See also
 single apostrophe .
 Similar symbol 

Punctuation